The 1996/97 FIS Ski Jumping Continental Cup was the 6th in a row (4th official) Continental Cup winter season in ski jumping for men.  For the first time in history competitions were held in summer on plastic. However, both summer season on plastic and winter season on snow together counted in joined overall ranking.

Other competitive circuits this season included the World Cup and Grand Prix.

Calendar

Men

Standings

Men

Europa Cup vs. Continental Cup 
This was originally last Europa Cup season and is also recognized as the first Continental Cup season by International Ski Federation although under this name began its first official season in 1993/94.

References

FIS Ski Jumping Continental Cup
1996 in ski jumping
1997 in ski jumping